The Alliance for Middle East Peace (ALLMEP) is the largest and fastest-growing network of Palestinian and Israeli peace-builders. They envision a Middle East in which this community leads their societies toward and beyond a sustainable peace. With a coalition of over 150 organizations—and tens of thousands of Israelis and Palestinians—they foster cooperation that increases impact, adds stability in times of crisis, and builds an environment conducive to peace over the long term.

ALLMEP’s work in the Middle East is focused on providing services and programs that raise the capacity of its members and foster a culture of field-wide cooperation, so that the peace-building field can have a greater impact. Internationally, ALLMEP works to educate and inform policy makers and opinion-formers about the work of Israeli and Palestinian peace-builders, and to encourage governments and philanthropists to provide greater resources for their work. Over the last decade, ALLMEP’s advocacy has unlocked hundreds of millions of dollars in inter-government support, and their programs have strengthened the entire peace-building field and cohered those working for peace into a genuine community.

ALLMEP's signature proposal is an International Fund for Israeli-Palestinian Peace to support and encourage efforts to build peace in the region. The concept is based on the International Fund for Ireland which was created twelve years before the Good Friday Agreement, with the U.K.’s Chief Negotiator Jonathan Powell (Labour adviser) calling it its “great unsung hero”.

ALLMEP’s initial advocacy for the Fund in Washington secured over $130 million in dedicated funding for Israeli/Palestinian peace-building within the Office of Conflict Management and Mitigation (CMM) of USAID. These funds, delivered over a decade, represented the first ever dedicated U.S. pot of funding for Israeli and Palestinian peace-builders, and the largest single funding source available for this work. More recently, in December 2020, Congress passed into law the Nita M. Lowey Middle East Partnership for Peace Act (MEPPA), named after Congresswoman Nita M. Lowey, which provides  $250 million dollars over five years to peace-building and economic development projects in the region. In addition to its work in the United States, other governments around the world have continued to take interest in ALLMEP’s International Fund model. ALLMEP has briefed over 30 countries on the concept, which has been featured at high level international meetings and at the UN Security Council.  In 2018 the U.K. Government officially endorsed the concept, and in 2021 it was endorsed by the leader of the Labour Party (UK) and became the official policy of the Liberal Democrats (UK), with 65 Parliamentarians also writing to the U.K. Foreign Secretary urging Britain to play “a decisive leadership role” in creating the Fund.

History 
ALLMEP was conceived of in the summer of 2003, when volunteer lawyers in Washington, DC, offered their pro bono support to a number of people-to-people organizations working to build partnerships between Israelis and Palestinians, Arabs and Jews in the Middle East. The group first convened informally in February 2004 as a dozen organizations participated  in the first Middle East Coexistence Conference on Capitol Hill in Washington, DC. Following that conference, the organizations agreed to form an ongoing coalition, ALLMEP, which was formally incorporated in 2006.

It quickly grew from 14 organizations in 2004 to 27 in 2005 and 44 NGOs in 2007. As of 2022, ALLMEP’s current membership exceeds 150 organizations working across a variety of sectors, such as technology, agriculture, sports, youth engagement, dialogue, advocacy, and education.

Since its inception, ALLMEP has brought the work of these organizations—and the inspiring stories of their participants—to the awareness of policymakers and influencers in Washington and around the world. It has also partnered with Jewish, Muslim, Christian, and Arab religious and diaspora groups to bring their support to the peace-builders in the Middle East.

For many years, ALLMEP has hosted an annual event in Washington, DC. In June 2005, ALLMEP held a summer conference on coexistence. The event included Middle East ambassadors, Jewish and Muslim religious leaders, members of Congress, State Department officials, leading pro-Israel and pro-Palestinian activists, and Middle East NGO activists to discuss ways to advance grassroots peace-building. More than 250 participated, including diplomats from Tunisia, Yemen, Sweden, Saudi Arabia, and Afghanistan.

The programming included a panel discussion by Egyptian Ambassador Fahmy, Jordanian Prince Firas bin Raad, Palestinian Chief Representative Hassan Abdel Rahman, Luxembourg Ambassador (during EU presidency) Arlette Conzemius-Paccoud, and former U.S. Ambassador Philip Wilcox of the Washington Middle East Institute. ALLMEP members also met with over 30 congressional offices to brief policymakers on their work.

In March 2006, ALLMEP co-sponsored a reception and screening of a new documentary film about coexistence efforts, Encounter Point. In conjunction with this event, ALLMEP and JustVision representatives met with more than 37 congressional offices.

Nita M. Lowey Middle East Partnership for Peace (MEPPA)
In December 2020, over a decade of ALLMEP advocacy led to the passage into law of the Nita M. Lowey Middle East Partnership for Peace Act (MEPPA). This new fund delivers $250 million over at least five years to projects that support peace-building and Palestinian economic development and partnerships. It represents the largest investment ever in the region’s peace-builders. The legislation grew out of ALLMEP’s 12-year campaign to establish an International Fund for Israeli-Palestinian Peace, which continues to gain momentum among other governments interested in leveraging this game-changing U.S. investment.

The Lowey Fund recognizes that sustainable and lasting peace must be built from the ground up to create a broad base of support. The fund is being administered through two different U.S. agencies: USAID for people-to-people programs and the U.S. International Development Finance Corporation for economic projects.

On July 21, 2021, the House Foreign Affairs Committee held a hearing on Israeli/Palestinian peace-building that explored key elements of the conflict. The virtual convening featured expert witness testimonies from Lucy Kurtzer-Ellenbogen of the United States Institute of Peace, Nada Majdalani of EcoPeace Middle East, Meredith Rothbart of Amal-Tikva, and Daniel Runde of the Center for Strategic and International Studies. The hearing discussed ALLMEP’s advocacy work and the massive potential that MEPPA legislation and increased funding for peace-building work could unlock.

Groundwork Podcast
In August 2021, ALLMEP launched their Groundwork Podcast in collaboration with New Israel Fund. The podcast opened with the Mixed Cities miniseries, which profiled citizen activists working in Jerusalem, Haifa, and Lod in the aftermath of the Gaza war in May of that year. These first episodes were hosted by Palestinian activist, Sally Abed, and Israeli journalist, Dina Kraft.

ALLMEP and New Israel Fund are currently producing a full length season and follow-on miniseries, scheduled for release later in 2022.

Regional Programming
Alongside its global advocacy, ALLMEP also provides a number of member services to its 150+ members. These include regional programs designed to enhance, amplify, and support the work of its members. These include Mid East Storytellers, AlumnHub, ScaleHub Capacity Building, and more.

Mid East Storytellers was founded by ALLMEP and B8 of Hope, a 2016 Swiss non-profit, in collaboration with Pendulum Creative Changency supporting a handful of peace-building Palestinian and Israeli civil society and grassroots initiatives. It is produced by Pendulum, an agency dedicated to helping individuals and organizations tools for storytelling. Mid East Storytellers was born out of the idea that storytelling is a powerful tool to connect people across societies and amplify the voices and values of the peace building community. Its first cohort, launched in fall 2020, was made up of 15 personal stories, and its second cohort, which represented nine stories, was launched in 2021.

Through the funding secured with the Lowey Fund, ALLMEP unites, supports, and scales up peace-building NGOs to ready them for the multi-million-dollar grants. ScaleHub was founded to help organizations work more effectively and strategically with one another, strengthening a cooperative field-wide culture and ensuring that every dollar invested in the region by funders like USAID goes that much further. The program has multiple components: member trainings, individual consultancies, and a capacity building practitioners’ forum. ScaleHub’s first training cohort comprises ALLMEP’s Palestinian members in the cross-border space, who have been severely affected by broken diplomacy, the COVID-19 pandemic, and a dearth of private investment. Further cohorts will include shared society and Israeli members.

AlumnnHub, formerly Alumni Leadership Forum (ALF), brings together alumni coordinators from a cross-section of ALLMEP member organizations each month to learn from each other’s best practices, maximize resources, and conduct joint activities to advance and professionalize the sphere of alumni engagement. The goal is to leverage the power and diversity of the thousands of graduates of Palestinian and Israeli peace-building programs by forging a community of next-generation leaders who can play a central role in shaping a more peaceful future in their respective communities. Over the past decades, Israeli and Palestinian peace NGOs have produced tens of thousands of program alumni who have been transformed by the experience of engaging with “the Other.” Yet too often, organizations are understandably preoccupied with the ongoing work of recruiting and training new participants rather than ensuring that those who have already graduated are leveraging their experience towards social and political impact. Rooted in ALLMEP’s theory of change is an understanding that Israelis and Palestinians who have passed through our members’ programs form a privileged constituency who together can establish the foundations for lasting peace in the region.

A core pillar of ALLMEP’s membership program is supporting and amplifying the work of our members. In service of this aim, ALLMEP offers quarterly media trainings for the communications and marketing staff of our member organizations. The trainings seek to enhance the strategic and technical skills of our members, so they can more effectively showcase their work to prospective donors, policy makers, and other key stakeholders. In 2021, ALLMEP hosted media trainings on Video Production, Social Media Strategy, and Content Creation. ALLMEP has plans to host future modules on Paid Social Media, Earned Media, and Best Practices in Media Outreach. As ALLMEP members continue to publish their research, theory of change, and updates about their work, ALLMEP has recently created a Members’ Content Hub. The Hub functions as a digital bulletin board, with monthly features written by our members about their work. Providing unique insights into their work and the impact they are having on the local community, ALLMEP hopes to showcase the diverse peace-building approaches within our membership, the deep impact that these organizations are having at the grassroots level, and the vast potential that lies within this community if scaled and properly resourced.

See also
 Israeli-Palestinian peace process
 Projects working for peace among Arabs and Israelis
 Trade Unions Linking Israel and Palestine
 Arava Institute for Environmental Studies
 Valley of Peace initiative

References

External links
 Group website

Israeli–Palestinian peace process
Israeli–Palestinian joint economic efforts
Non-governmental organizations involved in the Israeli–Palestinian peace process